Tarimoro is one of the 46 municipalities of the Mexican state of Guanajuato. The municipal seat is the city of Tarimoro.

The two main products that are produced in this municipality are peanuts and bricks.  Tarimoro's peanuts are unlike those found anywhere else. They are very distinct, with a thin shell and a sweeter taste. The lands in and around Tarimoro are very fertile and are irrigated by a canal that runs off a local dam called "La Presa del Cubo".

Tarimoro's main areas within Tarimoro City itself are known as "El Barrio", "El Centro", and "La Loma".  Other communities such as "El Aguacate" are within walking distance of Tarimoro.

Tarimoro's local festivities are in the month of September.  The festivities begin on the 20th and end with a grand finale celebration on the 29th.  These traditional, local festivities reflect and honor the patron saint of Tarimoro, which is San Miguel.  Giant floats are created and are adorned beautifully with many decorations of bright lively colors and full of life size religious characters. The floats are driven through downtown Tarimoro followed by local bands playing their own unique tunes that entertain hundreds of citizens and tourists alike.

The majority of Tarimoro's population have families living in the United States.  Particularly concentrated in Dallas, Chicago, San Francisco, San Antonio, and many others scattered over the country.  The amount of funds that comes into Tarimoro every year from relatives in the United States has a great impact on its citizens' lives, and is accounted as the main source of income for many families.

Geography
Tarimoro borders Celaya to the north, Cortázar to the northeast, Jerécuaro and Apaseo el Alto to the east, Salvatierra to the west, and Acámbaro to the south.

The most notable sites in Tarimoro are: Tarimoro City, La Moncada, Panales Jamaica (Cañones), San Juan Bautista de Cacalote, Caldares de Panales, El Jardin, El Acebuche, and La Presa.

Tarimoro has mountains to the east, along with a national preserve to the southeast. The climate there is subtropical with rains in September and cold weather from November to January.

External links
Official site of Municipio de Tarimoro

Municipalities of Guanajuato

pt:Tarimoro